Julia Maria Kronlid (born 16 July 1980) is a Swedish politician for the Sweden Democrats and a member of the Riksdagen since the 2010 general election. She represents the Stockholm County electorate.

Career 
She worked as a volunteer nurse for the Pingstmission - a Pentecostal Evangelical development work at a hospital clinic in Papua New Guinea.

Political career 
Kronlid joined the Sweden Democrats in 2006. In the 2010 Swedish general election, she was elected to the Riksdag as a member of the party.

From 12 October 2010, Kronlid took maternity leave and was replaced temporarily by Stellan Bojerud. She returned to the Riksdagen on 18 April 2011. Since 2013, she has been a chairman of the Sweden Democrats party board.

Kronlid currently sits on the Riksdagens Committee on Foreign Affairs specializing in foreign politics and humanitarian assistance politics for other countries. She said during the Sweden Democrats annual party congress in 2009 that she thought her party should help refugees in the area of the crisis.

In 2015, she proposed a motion in the Riksdag to lower the abortion limit in Sweden from 18 weeks to 12 weeks.

After the 2022 Swedish general election, she was named Second Deputy Speaker of the Riksdag.

Views 
In an article in Svenska Dagbladet in December 2015, Kronlid criticized that 30% of Swedish foreign aid was used to finance immigration into Sweden. She stated that after she had been visiting refugee camps in both Jordan and Lebanon, she thought it was obvious that more aid was needed to the immediate area of the crisis and not for immigration costs for Sweden.

Kronlid believes that human evolution should not be the only theory taught to children in schools. She has further stated that she rejects the scientific consensus that that humans and apes evolved from a common ancestor.

Personal life 
She resides in Glanshammar and is married to local politician David Kronlid; the couple has two children together: a daughter and a son.

References

External links 

1980 births
Living people
Members of the Riksdag from the Sweden Democrats
People from Örebro Municipality
Place of birth missing (living people)
Women members of the Riksdag
21st-century Swedish women politicians
Members of the Riksdag 2010–2014
Members of the Riksdag 2014–2018
Members of the Riksdag 2018–2022
Members of the Riksdag 2022–2026
21st-century Swedish politicians